The 2022 South Tyneside Metropolitan Borough Council election took place on 5 May 2022 to elect members of South Tyneside Council. This was on the same day as other local elections. 19 of the 54 seats were up for election, with 1 ward (Harton) electing 2 councillors.

Background
Since the first election in 1973, South Tyneside has always been under Labour control, aside from a brief period of no overall control from 1978 to 1979. In the 2021 election, Labour lost 4 seats with a vote share of 43.3%, independents gained 1 with 20.2%, the Green Party gained 2 with 13.8%, and the Conservatives gained their first seat since 2018 with 21.5% of the vote.

The seats up for election this year were last elected in 2018. In that election, Labour gained 1 seat with 57.3%, the Conservatives gained 1 seat with 22.9% of the vote, and the Green Party failed to make any further gains with 13.5%.

Previous council composition 

Changes:
 June 2021: John Robertson (independent) resigns from council
 July 2021: Jay Potts wins by-election for Labour from independent, Jeff Milburn (independent) disqualified from council
 September 2021: Stan Wildhirt wins by-election for Conservatives from independent
 February 2022: Rob Dix (Labour) dies; seat left vacant until May election

Results

Results by ward
An asterisk indicates an incumbent councillor.

Beacon and Bents

Bede

Biddick and All Saints

Boldon Colliery

Cleadon and East Boldon

Cleadon Park

Fellgate and Hedworth

Harton

Hebburn North

Hebburn South

Horsley Hill

Monkton

Primrose

Simonside and Rekendyke

West Park

Westoe

Whitburn and Marsden

Whiteleas

References

South Tyneside
South Tyneside Council elections